Raymond Nasher (October 26, 1921 – March 16, 2007) was a Boston Latin School (1939) and Duke University alumnus (1943) who was an avid art collector. Together with his wife Patsy, he amassed a substantial number of the world's most renowned sculptures (including works by Auguste Rodin, Pablo Picasso, Alexander Calder, Harry Bertoia, Henri Matisse and Henry Moore) and various other significant pieces. Nasher gave the lead gift for the creation of the Nasher Sculpture Center in Dallas, Texas and Duke University's art museum, the Nasher Museum of Art at Duke University in Durham, North Carolina.

In the early 1960s, Nasher developed NorthPark Center, the mall that is currently the second largest in Texas. At the time of its construction, it was the largest climate-controlled, indoor building in the world.

External links
Nasher Museum of Art at Duke University
Nasher Sculpture Center
Boston Quarterly, Raymond Nasher and the Collector's Art
Dallas Morning News obituary accessed 17 March 2007

1921 births
2007 deaths
American art collectors
Duke University alumni
20th-century American businesspeople
Boston Latin School alumni